This is list of members of the Argentine Chamber of Deputies from 10 December 2009 to 9 December 2011.

Composition

By province

By political groups
as of 9 December 2011

Election cycles

List of deputies

Notes

References

External links
List of deputies in the official website (archived)

2009
2009 in Argentina
2010 in Argentina
2011 in Argentina